This is a list of the 21 members of the European Parliament for Portugal in the 2019 to 2024 session.

These MEPs were elected at the 2019 European Parliament election in Portugal.

List 

On the Socialist Party list: (S&D)
Pedro Marques
Maria Manuel Leitão Marques
Pedro Silva Pereira
Margarida Marques
André Bradford – until 18 July 2019Isabel Estrada Carvalhais – from 3 September 2019
Sara Cerdas
Carlos Zorrinho
Isabel Santos
Manuel Pizarro – until 10 September 2022 João Albuquerque – from 13 September 2022

On the Social Democratic Party list: (EPP Group)
Paulo Rangel
Lídia Pereira
José Manuel Fernandes
Maria da Graça Carvalho
Álvaro Amaro
Cláudia Aguiar

On the Left Bloc list: (GUE–NGL)
Marisa Matias
José Gusmão

On the Democratic Unitarian Coalition list: (GUE–NGL)
João Ferreira – until 5 July 2021João Pimenta Lopes – from 5 July 2021
Sandra Pereira

On the CDS – People's Party list: (EPP Group)
Nuno Melo

On the People–Animals–Nature list: (Greens-EFA)
Francisco Guerreiro (left the party on 17 June 2020)

References

See also 

 List of members of the European Parliament, 2019–2024
 2019 European Parliament election
 Politics of Portugal

Lists of Members of the European Parliament for Portugal
Lists of Members of the European Parliament 2019–2024
MEPs for Portugal 2019–2024